Ab Darreh may refer to:
 Ab Darreh, Khuzestan
 Ab Darreh, Kohgiluyeh and Boyer-Ahmad
 Ab Darreh, Boyer-Ahmad, Kohgiluyeh and Boyer-Ahmad Province
 Ab Darreh, Qazvin